WKAR may refer to:

WKAR (AM), a radio station (870 AM), licensed to serve East Lansing, Michigan, United States 
WKAR-FM, a radio station (90.5 FM), licensed to serve East Lansing
WKAR-TV, a television station (channel 33, virtual 23), licensed to serve East Lansing